Becilla de Valderaduey is a municipality located in Valladolid, Castile and León, Spain. According to the 2004 census (INE), the municipality had a population of 362 inhabitants.

References 

Municipalities in the Province of Valladolid